The American Carnage Tour was a North American concert tour headlined by American thrash metal bands Slayer and Megadeth. The first leg of the tour took place from July 23 to September 4, 2010, and was supported by Testament. The second leg of the tour ran from September 24 to October 21, 2010, and was supported by Anthrax.

The American Carnage tour marked the first time since the Clash of the Titans tour in 1990–1991 that Slayer and Megadeth had toured together with either Testament or Anthrax; unlike Clash of the Titans, however, this tour did not feature Suicidal Tendencies or Alice in Chains. Megadeth, Slayer and Testament were touring in support of their respective albums World Painted Blood, Endgame and The Formation of Damnation, while Anthrax (who had just recently reunited with Joey Belladonna as their singer) were working on their tenth studio album Worship Music, which was released in the following year.

Tour dates

Opening acts
Testament (July 23 – September 4, 2010)
Anthrax (September 24 – October 21, 2010)

Personnel

Slayer:
Kerry King – guitars
Jeff Hanneman – guitars
Tom Araya – bass, vocals
Dave Lombardo – drums

Megadeth:
 Dave Mustaine – guitars, lead vocals
 Shawn Drover – drums, percussion
 Chris Broderick – guitars, backing vocals 
 David Ellefson – bass, backing vocals

Testament:
 Eric Peterson – rhythm guitar, backing vocals
 Chuck Billy – lead vocals
 Alex Skolnick – lead guitar, backing vocals
 Greg Christian – bass
 Paul Bostaph – drums

Anthrax:
 Scott Ian – rhythm guitar, backing vocals
 Charlie Benante – drums, percussion
 Frank Bello – bass, backing vocals
 Rob Caggiano – lead guitar
 Joey Belladonna – lead vocals

References

External links
Official Slayer website
Official Megadeth website

Official Testament website
Official Anthrax website

2010 concert tours
Anthrax (American band) concert tours
Megadeth concert tours
Slayer concert tours
Testament (band) concert tours